

The Charles L. Shrewsbury House (also known as the Shrewsbury–Windle House) is a historic house museum located at 301 West First Street in Madison, Indiana.  Built in 1842 to a design by Francis Costigan, it was designated a National Historic Landmark in 1994 for its fine Classical Revival architecture.  It is located in the Madison Historic District.

History
The Charles Shrewsbury House, also known as the Shrewsbury–Windle House, is the 1848 Greek Revival home of Charles Shrewsbury, a salt-barge riverboat captain, flour manufacturer and pork merchant. Shrewsbury was also the mayor of Madison. The house was designed by Francis Costigan. The Shrewsbury house is a two-story brick building, with a symmetrical 3-bay facade and stone trim details.  The building corners feature brick pilasters rising to stone capitals, supporting an entablature punctuated by small attic-level windows.  The interior has twelve rooms, thirteen fireplaces and a fifty-three step spiral staircase. The floor to ceiling windows are thirteen feet tall. A man on horseback could easily step through the enormous front and rear doors, which are twelve feet in height.

Architectural historians have ranked the house's free-standing spiral staircase as the most impressive part of the interior.  Built of pine stairs and cherry railings, the staircase ascends from the middle of the house, supporting its own weight.  Aside from allowing access to the second floor, the staircase helps to cool the house: hot air from the first floor can rise through the stairwell and leave the house through the attic windows.

References

Further reading
 99 Historic Homes of Indiana by Marsh Davis and Bill Shaw, copyright 2002 pages 229–231.
 Historic American Buildings Survey in Indiana, edited by Thomas M. Slade, copyright 1983, pages 72,73.

External links

Shrewsbury–Windle House – Historic Madison
Historic Landmarks of Indiana – spiral staircase

Historic American Buildings Survey in Indiana
Houses completed in 1848
Historic house museums in Indiana
Houses in Jefferson County, Indiana
National Historic Landmarks in Indiana
National Register of Historic Places in Jefferson County, Indiana
Museums in Madison, Indiana
Houses on the National Register of Historic Places in Indiana
Historic district contributing properties in Indiana